Nationality words link to articles with information on the nation's poetry or literature (for instance, Irish or France).

Events
 Poet Cid Corman begins Origin magazine in response to the failure of a magazine that Robert Creeley had planned. The magazine typically features one writer per issue and runs, with breaks, until the mid-1980s. Poets featured include Robert Creeley, Robert Duncan, Larry Eigner, Denise Levertov, William Bronk, Theodore Enslin, Charles Olson, Louis Zukofsky, Gary Snyder, Lorine Niedecker, Wallace Stevens, William Carlos Williams and Paul Blackburn. The magazine also leads to the establishment of Origin Press, which publishes books by a similar range of poets.
 Bad Lord Byron, a film directed by David MacDonald about the Romantic poet.
 Czesław Miłosz, Polish poet, translator, literary critic, future (1980) winner of the Nobel Prize in Literature, becomes an exile this year.
 The Dolmen Press is founded in Dublin, Ireland by Liam and Josephine Miller to provide a publishing outlet for Irish poets and artists. The Press operates in Dublin from 1951 until Liam Miller's death in 1987.

Works published in English
Listed by nation where the work was first published and again by the poet's native land, if different; substantially revised works listed separately:

Canada
 Irving Layton, The Black Huntsmen: Poems. Montreal.
 Tom MacInnes, In the Old of my Age
 Duncan Campbell Scott, Selected Poems, edited by E. K. Brown
 A. J. M. Smith, The Worldly Muse
 Kay Smith, Footnote to the Lord's Prayer and Other Poems
 Raymond Souster, City Hall Street. Toronto: Ryerson.
 Anne Wilkinson, Counterpoint to Sleep

New Zealand
 James K. Baxter, Recent Trends in New Zealand Poetry, scholarship
 Allen Curnow, editor, A Book of New Zealand Verse 1923-50, anthology
 Denis Glover, Sings Harry, New Zealand
 M. H. Holcroft, Discovered Isles, scholarship
Louis Johnson:
 Editor, New Zealand Poetry Yearbook, first annual edition, anthology
The Sun Among the Ruins
 Roughshod Among the Lilies
 Charles Spear, Twopence Coloured
 Hubert Witheford, The Falcon Mark

United Kingdom
 W. H. Auden, Nones, including the poem "In Praise of Limestone"
 E. C. Bentley, Clerihews Complete
 Basil Bunting, Seeds, a long poem, published by Poetry magazine
 Roy Campbell, Light on a Dark Horse, autobiography
 Charles Causley:
 Farewell Aggie Weston
 Hands to Dance
 Jack Clemo, The Clay Verge
 Keith Douglas, Collected Poems
 Robert Graves, Poems and Satires
 James Kirkup, The Submerged Village, and Other Poems
 John Lehmann, The Age of the Dragon
 Iona and Peter Opie, The Oxford Dictionary of Nursery Rhymes
 Poems of Today, British poetry anthology, fourth series
 Enoch Powell, The Wedding Gift & Dancer’s End (London: Falcon Press,) .
 Anne Ridler, The Golden Bird, and Other Poems
 Alan Ross, Poetry, 1945–1950
 John Wain, Mixed Feelings

United States
 W. H. Auden, Nones, English-born poet living and published in the United States
 John Malcolm Brinnin, The Sorrows of Cold Stone
 John Ciardi, From Time to Time, including "My Father's Watch"
 Langston Hughes, Montage of a Dream Deferred, including "Harlem"
 Randall Jarrell:
 Losses, New York: Harcourt, Brace
 The Seven-League Crutches, New York: Harcourt, Brace
 Hugh Kenner, The Poetry of Ezra Pound, highly influential in causing a re-assessment of Pound's poetry (New Directions), criticism
 Robert Lowell, The Mills of the Kavanaughs, New York: Harcourt, Brace
 James Merrill, First Poems
 Marianne Moore, Collected Poems, winner of both the Pulitzer Prize and the National Book Award for poetry in 1952
 Ogden Nash, Parents Keep Out
 Adrienne Rich, A Change of World, her first volume, selected by W. H. Auden for the Yale Series of Younger Poets
 Theodore Roethke, Praise to the End!, 13 long poems about a child's sensibility and developing consciousness
 Louis Simpson, Good News of Death and Other Poems, Jamaican-born poet living in the United States
 Clark Ashton Smith, The Dark Chateau
 Jean Toomer, Cane
 Theodore Weiss, The Catch
 William Carlos Williams:
 Paterson, Book IV
 The Collected Earlier Poems
 The Autobiography of William Carlos Williams

Other in English
 Nagendranath Gupta, editor and translator, Eastern Poetry, Allahabad: Indian Press, second edition, Bombay: Hind Kitabs (first edition 1929), anthology; Indian poetry in English
 Louis Simpson, ''Good News of Death and Other Poems, Jamaican-born poet living in the United States
 Rex Ingamells, The Great South Land, Melbourne, a history of Australia from primordial times, Australia

Works published in other languages

France
 Pierre Jean Jouve, Ode
 Alphonse Métérié, Proella
 Jacques Prévert:
 Histoires
 Spectacle
 Jules Supervielle, Naissances
 Frédéric Jacques Temple, Foghorn

India
In each section, listed in alphabetical order by first name:

 Rajendra Shah, Andolan, Gujarati language
 Binod Chandra Nayak, Oriya:
 Nilacandrara Upatyaka
 Candra O tara
 Hem Barua, Balichandra, Indian, Assamese
 Mangalacharan Chattopadhyay, Mergh Brsti Jar, Bengali
 Sumitra Kumari Sinha, Panthini, Hindi-language
 Sundaram, Yatra  Gujarati language
 V. A. Anandakkuttan, Dipavali, Malayalam
 Naresh Guha, Duranta Dupur, Bengali
 Ajneya, editor, Dusara Saptak, Hindi, influential anthology in the Nai Kavita ("New Poetry") movement, which has been said to have started with this book, which contains poetry from Bhavani Prasad Misra, Sakunta Mathur, Hari Narayan Vyas, Shamasher Bahadur Singh, Naresh Mehta, Raghuvir Sahay and Dharamvir Bharati (see also Tar Saptak 1943)

Other
 Simin Behbahani, Seh-tar-e Shekasteh ("The Broken Lute"), Persia
 Alberto de Lacerda, Poemas, Portugal
 Hushang Ebtehaj (H. E. Sayeh) سراب ("Mirage"), Persian poet published in Iran
 Uri Zvi Greenberg, Reḥovot Hanahar ("The Streets of the River"), poems lamenting the loss of Jews in Europe; Hebrew-language, Israel
 Cesare Pavese, Verrà la morte ed avrà i tuoi occhi ("Death Will Come and Will Have Your Eyes"), Turin: Einaudi; Italy

Awards and honors
 Nobel Prize in Literature: Pär Lagerkvist, Swedish poet, author, playwright and writer
 Guggenheim Fellowship awarded to E.E. Cummings
 National Book Award for Poetry: Wallace Stevens, The Auroras of Autumn
 Pulitzer Prize for poetry: Carl Sandburg, Complete Poems
 Bollingen Prize: John Crowe Ransom
 Canada: Governor General's Award, poetry or drama: The Mulgrave Road, Charles Bruce

Births
Death years link to the corresponding "[year] in poetry" article:
 January 1 – Abul Bashar, Bengali poet and writer
 January 29 – Neil Shepard, American poet, essayist, professor of creative writing and literary magazine editor
 February 23 – Leevi Lehto (died 2019), Finnish poet, translator and programmer
 March 12 – Susan Musgrave, Canadian poet and children's author
 March 21 – Lesley Choyce, Canadian novelist, writer, children's book writer, poet, and academic, founder of Pottersfield Press, host of the television program "Choyce Words" and "Off the Page"; born in the United States and immigrated to Canada in 1979
 April 5 – Lillian Allen, Canadian dub poet
 April 21 – Brigit Pegeen Kelly, American poet and academic, daughter of author Robert Glynn Kelly and married to poet Michael Madonick
 April 22 – Andrew Hudgins, American poet, essayist and academic
 May 9:
 Christopher Dewdney, Canadian poet, writer, artist, creative writing teacher and writer in residence at various universities
 Jorie Graham, American poet and academic
 Joy Harjo, Native-American poet, musician and author
 May 30 – Garrett Hongo, American poet and academic, born in Volcano, Hawaii
 June 20:
 Paul Muldoon Irish poet living in the United States
 Noel Rowe (died 2007), Australian, poet, writer, academic and Roman Catholic priest in the Marist order
 July 10 – Robert Priest, English-born Canadian poet and children's author
 July 25 – Angela Jackson, African American
 September 13 – Suzanne Lummis, American poet, teacher and co-founder of the Los Angeles Poetry Festival
 October 8 – Jenny Boult, also known as "MML Bliss" (died 2005), Australian
 October 12 – Peter Goldsworthy, Australian poet, novelist, short-story writer, opera librettist and medical practitioner
 November 13 – Robert Hilles, Canadian poet and novelist
 December 13 – Anne-Marie Alonzo (died 2005), Canadian playwright, poet, novelist, critic and publisher
 Also:
 Ralph Angel, American poet and translator
 Robin Becker, American
 Peter Boyle, Australian
 Ron Charach, Canadian
 Peter Christensen, Canadian
 Stephen Edgar, Australian poet, editor and indexer
 James Galvin, American poet, novelist and writer
 Robert Harris (died 1993), Australian
 Peter Johnson, American
 Jill Jones, Australian poet and writer
 Anne Kellas, South African poet, critic and editor, immigrant to Australia
 Kim Maltman, Canadian poet and physicist
 Pi O, "П O", Australian poet and anarchist
 Betsy Struthers, Canadian poet and novelist
 Ania Walwicz, Australian poet, writer and artist
 Afaa M. Weaver, American
 Robert Wrigley, American poet and academic
 Eddy Yanofsky, American
 Ray A. Young Bear, American

Deaths
Birth years link to the corresponding "[year] in poetry" article:
 January 17 – Jyoti Prasad Agarwala (born 1903), playwright, songwriter, poet, writer and film maker; Indian, writing in Assamese
 January 31 – Seemab Akbarabadi سیماب اکبرآبادی (born 1882) Urdu poet from India
 April 3 – Henrik Visnapuu (born 1890), Estonian
 June 18 – Angelos Sikelianos (born 1884), Greek
 June 28 – Fumiko Hayashi 林 芙美子 (born 1903 or 1904; sources disagree), novelist, writer and poet (a woman; surname: Hayashi)
 July 3 – Sydney Jephcott (born 1864), Australian poet
 September 18 – Gelett Burgess (born 1866), American artist, art critic, poet, author, and humorist
 December 4 – Pedro Salinas (born 1891), Spanish
 Also:
 Kaykobad (born 1857), Bengali poet
 Hertha Kraftner (born 1928), German
 Sotiris Skipis (born 1881), Greek

See also

 Poetry
 List of poetry awards
 List of years in poetry

Notes

20th-century poetry
Poetry